Pjer Žalica (born 7 May 1964 in Sarajevo) is a Bosnian film director, screenwriter and a professor at the Academy of Performing Arts in Sarajevo. His father Miodrag (1926–1992) was a noted dramaturgist and poet who scripted several TV movies.

He has directed several short films, only one of which is (Mostar Sevdah Reunion 2000) as well as three feature films, Gori vatra (2003), and Kod amidže Idriza (2004).

In May 2008, he directed the music video for the duet Dabogda by Dino Merlin and Hari Mata Hari. In 2017, Žalica signed the Declaration on the Common Language of the Croats, Serbs, Bosniaks and Montenegrins.

He is married to Bosnian actress Jasna Žalica and has one child with the actress.

References

External links

Bosnia and Herzegovina film directors
Film people from Sarajevo
Living people
1964 births
Signatories of the Declaration on the Common Language
Academic staff of the University of Sarajevo